In Australia, fossil fuel divestment is being led by Universities and Local Councils as part of the global fossil fuel divestment campaign launched by 350.org in 2011. In 2015, the number of Australian councils with divestment commitments increased dramatically from 2 to 17. On 15 September 2016 the status of Australian council divestment was:
 Fossil free investment funds held by Australian Local Councils: 6,181,195,620
 Number of Local Councils with fossil free divestment commitments: 27

Most Australian councils cannot invest in shares, meaning they have no investments directly in climate-change-contributing fossil fuel companies. However, most councils have exposure to fossil fuels via their term deposit accounts with the big Australian banks whom in turn are financing billions of dollars worth of coal and gas projects across the country. Many councils have been identifying their exposure to 'fossil' banks and have found that the majority of Australian banks (particularly banks other than the 'big four') do not provide finance for the fossil fuel industry.

Research on which banks fund the fossil fuel industry, and those that do not, has been completed and is routinely updated by Market Forces an independent research organisation. Although there have been some public commitments  indicating the Australian 'big four' banks will not invest in certain fossil fuel related projects, at 30 June 2016, the 'big four' remain heavily invested in fossil fuel.

Local Council Divestment by State or Territory
Local Councils in Australia are the level of government that is most in touch with wishes and needs of the local community. A growing number of local councils have made commitments to divest their funds from fossil fuel companies and institutions.

Commitments and Documentation
The following tables summarise the divestment actions and commitments of Australian local councils. The table includes references to documents recording council investment & divestment policies and divestment motions that were put before the council, voted on and passed. These documents can be used as a reference point for other councils considering fossil fuel divestment.

Council Amalgamations and Changes
Note in 2016, several NSW local councils were subject to forced amalgamation by the NSW State Government. These councils were put under administration and the democratically elected councillors were sacked. The councils currently continue to operate but it is expected there will be changes resulting from the mergers and enforced state government policy. The motivation and justification for amalgamation appears to be due to objection to the proposed WestConnex motorway by the councils and the community. The Geographical boundaries of councils are also subject to periodic review. The following table refers to Councils as an organisational unit at the time the commitment is made.

Australian Capital Territory
The existence of local government in Australia is an exclusive "power of the states or territories". Due to the relative small size of the ACT, there are no smaller local governments. The ACT government is responsible for the roles that are otherwise performed by a local council.

New South Wales

Tasmania

Victoria

Western Australia

Other States
In South Australia, Northern Territory and Queensland, there are no known council fossil fuel divestments at this time.

Community Support and Information Sources
Local community groups around Australia are supporting Australian councils to divest. The results of their work has been compiled by Fossil Free Australia and the source of information comes from publicly available sites and documents found in the Public domain.

See also 
 Divestment
 Fossil fuel divestment
 ANU – Australian National University

References

Climate change in Australia
Fossil fuels in Australia
Politics of Australia
Ethical banking
Local government in Australia